Sesame Street: Ready, Set, Grover! is a Sesame Street video game that was released on August 2, 2011. The game is available for the Wii and Nintendo DS and promotes healthy advice, as part of Sesame Workshop's Healthy Habits for Life project.  Unlike 2010's Cookie's Counting Carnival and Elmo's A-to-Zoo Adventure, Grover was not released on Microsoft Windows.

Gameplay

In the game, Grover sets out to create a series of challenges designed to help his friends get exercise. There are four locations featured in the game: the Street, the Garden, the Park, and the Pond; each location contains five challenges to play through.

References

2011 video games
Sesame Street video games
Warner Bros. video games
Video games developed in the United States
Children's educational video games
Nintendo DS games
Nintendo 3DS games
Wii games
Multiplayer and single-player video games